Lucienne Anna Reichardt (born 1 May 1991) is a Dutch former footballer who played as a midfielder for West Ham United of the FA WSL in England.

Club career
Reichardt brought a successful six-year spell with ADO Den Haag to an end in summer 2014, because she wanted to complete her psychology studies and she had a persistent Achilles tendon injury. Two years later she found a doctor who performed surgery allowing her to return to top level football. Instead of rejoining ADO Den Haag, she signed for her girlhood club AFC Ajax. 

In July 2018, Reichardt transferred to West Ham United from Ajax. She was part of the squad that reached the final of the 2018–19 FA Women's Cup, where she was an unused substitute. On 7 May 2019, she announced her decision to retire from football at the end of the FA WSL season, aged 28, in order to pursue a career as a psychologist. In her final professional match Reichardt stood in as West Ham's captain, but the team were beaten 4–0 by Brighton.

Honours

Club
ADO Den Haag
 Eredivisie winner: 2011–12
 KNVB Women's Cup winner: 2011–12, 2012–13

AFC Ajax
 Eredivisie winner: 2016–17, 2017–18
 KNVB Women's Cup winner: 2016–17, 2017–18

West Ham United
 Women's FA Cup runner-up: 2018–19

References

External links
 
Profile at OnsOranje.nl 

1991 births
Living people
Dutch women's footballers
West Ham United F.C. Women players
Women's association football midfielders
Expatriate women's footballers in England
Eredivisie (women) players
People from Drechterland
Footballers from North Holland
AFC Ajax (women) players
ADO Den Haag (women) players
BeNe League players
Dutch expatriate sportspeople in England
Women's Super League players
Dutch expatriate women's footballers